Veronica Signorini (born 28 July 1989) is an Italian triathlete.

Veronica Signorini moved her first steps in the world of triathlon in the 2007, with a 10th place debut in Sprint Triathlon City of Cremona. The following year, she participated in some races of the Italian calendar; in the 2009 Veronica Signorini dedicated all her time to the multidiscipline and the first podium arrived. The same year she also joined the Italian federation in its project called "Scuola di Alta Specializzazione"; she continued her growth in the practice of the three disciplines. In the 2011 the international debut in the European Cup in Cremona in a Sprint distance race. Many important results got in the 2014, joining Fabio Vedana as coach moving her targets to the ITU events and getting good placings: the best one is the 4th in the Africa Cup in the race of Larache in Morocco.

ITU Results

2015 
 10 Madrid ETU Cup (Spain)

2014 
 4 Larache ATU Cup (Morocco), 
 6 Tartu ETU Cup (Estonia); 
 10 Riga ETU Cup (Latvia), 
 19 Bratislava ETU WC (Slovakia);

2013 
 16 Cremona ETU (Italy); 
 18 Ginevra ETU (Switzerland), 
 24 Tiszaujvaros ITU WC (Hungary);

2012 
 16 Ginevra ETU Cup (Switzerland); 
 17 Mondello ETU Cup (Italy); 
 33 Cremona ETU Cup (Italy);

2011 
 21 Cremona ETU Cup (Italy);

Notes

External links
  Veronica Signorini's Club Triathlon Cremona Stradivari in Italian
 Veronica Signorini on ITU

Italian female triathletes
1989 births
Living people
21st-century Italian women